The 2014 Women's Junior European Volleyball Championship was played in Finland and Estonia, in this cities Tampere and Tartu, from August 16 to 24, 2014.

Participating teams
 Host
 
 
 Qualified through 2014 Women's Junior European Volleyball Championship Qualification

Pools

Preliminary round

Pool A 
 Venue: A. Le Coq SPORT Spordimaja, Tartu, Estonia

|}

|}

Pool B
 Venue: TESC E-Hall, Tampere, Finland
 

|}

|}

Championship round
 Venue: A. Le Coq SPORT Spordimaja, Tartu, Estonia

5th to 8th bracket

Classification 5–8

|}

Semifinals

|}

Classification 7–8

|}

Classification 5–6

|}

Classification 3–4

|}

Final

|}

Final standing

Individual awards
Most Valuable Player 
Best Scorer 
Best Setter 
Best Receiver 
Best Libero 
Best Server 
Best Blocker 
Best Spiker

References

External links
Website: CEV

Women's Junior European Volleyball Championship
2014 in volleyball
International volleyball competitions hosted by Finland
International volleyball competitions hosted by Estonia
2014 in Finnish sport
2014 in Estonian sport
Sports competitions in Tampere
Sport in Tartu
2014 in youth sport
August 2014 sports events in Europe